Topper Takes a Trip is a 1938 film directed by Norman Z. McLeod. It is a sequel to the 1937 film Topper. Constance Bennett, Roland Young, Billie Burke, and Alan Mowbray reprised their roles from the earlier film; only Cary Grant was missing (other than in a few shots taken from Topper). A ghost tries to reunite a couple who she had a hand in splitting up in the prior film. It was followed by another sequel, Topper Returns (1941).

Plot summary
To gain entry to Heaven, ghost Marion Kerby (Constance Bennett) has to do some good on earth. That means reuniting a divorcing couple, Cosmo (Roland Young) and Clara Topper (Billie Burke). To be fair, Marion played a part in their troubles: Clara mistakenly thought Marion was Cosmo's mistress. Making peace between the pair will mean accompanying Cosmo on a trip to the French Riviera and employing plenty of otherworldly tricks, with the help of a canine spirit named Mr. Atlas.

Cast
 Constance Bennett as Marion Kerby
 Roland Young as Cosmo Topper
 Billie Burke as Clara Topper
 Alan Mowbray as Wilkins, Topper's butler
 Verree Teasdale as Mrs. Nancy Parkhurst
 Franklin Pangborn as Louis
 Alexander D'Arcy as Baron de Rossi
 Spencer Charters as Judge 
 Irving Pichel as Prosecutor 
 Asta (billed as Skippy) as Mr. Atlas
 William Austin as Roulette Player (uncredited) 
 Wade Boteler as Police Sergeant (uncredited)

Awards
The film received one Oscar nomination in 1939 for Best Special Effects for Roy Seawright.

See also
 List of ghost films

References

External links

 
 
 
 
 Topper Takes a Trip Review at TV Guide

1939 films
1938 romantic comedy films
1930s screwball comedy films
1930s ghost films
American black-and-white films
American fantasy comedy films
American ghost films
American romantic comedy films
American romantic fantasy films
American screwball comedy films
American sequel films
1930s English-language films
Films directed by Norman Z. McLeod
Films based on American novels
Films based on fantasy novels
Films based on romance novels
Films scored by Hugo Friedhofer
Films set in New York City
United Artists films
1939 comedy films
1938 comedy films
1938 films
1930s American films